The 1986 FIFA World Cup qualification UEFA Group 4 was a UEFA qualifying group for the 1986 FIFA World Cup. The group comprised Bulgaria, East Germany, France, Luxembourg and Yugoslavia.

The group was won on goal difference by France with Bulgaria as the runners-up. Both teams qualified for the 1986 FIFA World Cup.

Standings

Results

The match was interrupted in the 10th minute due to a power failure at Koševo Stadium. Power was restored after 15 minutes and the contest resumed from the minute it got interrupted.

Goalscorers

6 goals

 Rainer Ernst

4 goals

 Ralf Minge
 Michel Platini

3 goals

 Georgi Dimitrov
 Dominique Rocheteau
 Yannick Stopyra

2 goals

 Plamen Getov
 Stoycho Mladenov
 Nasko Sirakov
 Andreas Thom
 Robby Langers
 Fadil Vokrri

1 goal

 Rusi Gochev
 Kostadin Kostadinov
 Boycho Velichkov
 Michael Glowatzky
 Ronald Kreer
 Matthias Liebers
 Uwe Zötzsche
 Philippe Anziani
 Patrick Battiston
 Luis Fernández
 Alain Giresse
 José Touré
 Mehmed Baždarević
 Milko Djurovski
 Ivan Gudelj
 Miloš Šestić
 Haris Škoro

1 own goal

 Guy Hellers (playing against Bulgaria)

External links
Fifa.com page
Rsssf page
Results and Scorers

4
1984–85 in East German football
1985–86 in East German football
1984–85 in French football
qual
1984–85 in Bulgarian football
qual
1984–85 in Yugoslav football
1985–86 in Yugoslav football
1984–85 in Luxembourgian football
1985–86 in Luxembourgian football